Hans Münch (9 March 1893 - 7 September 1983) was a Swiss conductor, composer, cellist, pianist, organist, and music educator of Alsatian birth. His compositional output includes one symphony (premiered 1951), Symphonische Improvisationen (1971), and a number of cantatas.

Life and career
Born into a family of musicians in Mulhouse, France (then in the German Empire), Münch was the son of conductor Eugen Münch and the nephew of organist and choral conductor Ernst Münch (1859-1928). He began his musical training with his father before pursuing studies in the organ and music theory with Albert Schweitzer. In 1912 he moved to Basel, ultimately becoming a naturalized citizen of Switzerland. He studied at the Basel Conservatory with Emil Braun (cello), Adolf Hamm (organ), and Hans Huber (composition).

From 1914 to 1916 Münch was a cellist in the Basel Symphony Orchestra. In 1918 he joined the faculty of the Basel Conservatory where he taught piano through 1932. He served as the director of the conservatory from 1935 to 1947. One of his notable students was Armando Santiago.

From 1921 to 1926 Münch conducted the Bach Choir in Basel, after which he was active directing various choral societies in the city like the Basel Gesangverein and the Basel Liedertafel. From 1935 to 1966 he conducted the Allgemeine Musikgesellschaft in Basel. He died in Basel at the age of 90.

References

1893 births
1983 deaths
Swiss male composers
Swiss conductors (music)
Male conductors (music)
Swiss cellists
Swiss pianists
Swiss organists
Male organists
Swiss music educators
Piano pedagogues
Musicians from Mulhouse
20th-century conductors (music)
20th-century pianists
20th-century organists
Male pianists
20th-century male musicians
20th-century Swiss composers
20th-century cellists